Gaspar of Braganza, Archbishop-Primate of Braga (Lisbon, 8 October 1716 – Braga, 18 January 1789) was a Portuguese clergyman, and the illegitimate son of John V of Portugal and Madalena Máxima de Miranda . He was Archbishop of Braga.  He was one of the three Children of Palhavã.

1716 births
1780 deaths
Gaspar
18th-century Roman Catholic archbishops in Portugal
Clergy from Lisbon
Illegitimate children of John V of Portugal
Sons of kings